Ivan Maximkin (born March 5, 1988) is a Russian former professional ice hockey defenceman.

Maximkin played in the Russian Superleague and Kontinental Hockey League for Lada Togliatti and Dynamo Moscow. He also had spells in the Kazakhstan Hockey Championship for Kazakhmys Satpaev, Saryarka Karagandy, Kazzinc-Torpedo and HC Astana.

Maximkim was selected 28th overall in the 2005 CHL Import Draft by the Ontario Hockey League's Erie Otters, though he ultimately never played in the league and remained in Russia.

References

External links

1988 births
Living people
HC Astana players
Buran Voronezh players
HC CSK VVS Samara players
HC Dynamo Moscow players
Gazprom-OGU Orenburg players
HC Izhstal players
Kazzinc-Torpedo players
HC Lada Togliatti players
People from Balakovo
Russian ice hockey defencemen
HC Ryazan players
Saryarka Karagandy players
Yermak Angarsk players
Sportspeople from Saratov Oblast